Springvale is an unincorporated community, in Randolph County, in the U.S. state of Georgia.

History
A post office called Springvale was established in 1885, and remained in operation until 1985. The name Springvale was applied to this place for commendatory reasons. A variant name is "Hamlet".

The Georgia General Assembly incorporated Springvale as a town in 1870. The town's municipal charter was repealed in 1995.

References

Former municipalities in Georgia (U.S. state)
Unincorporated communities in Georgia (U.S. state)
Unincorporated communities in Randolph County, Georgia
Populated places disestablished in 1995